Hamilton (Original Broadway Cast Recording) is the cast album to the 2015 musical Hamilton. The musical is based on the 2004 biography of Alexander Hamilton written by Ron Chernow, with music, lyrics, and book by Lin-Manuel Miranda. The recording stars Lin-Manuel Miranda, Leslie Odom Jr., Phillipa Soo, Renée Elise Goldsberry, Christopher Jackson, Daveed Diggs, Anthony Ramos, Okieriete Onaodowan, Jasmine Cephas Jones, and Jonathan Groff. The ensemble features Jon Rua, Thayne Jasperson, Sydney James Harcourt, Ephraim Sykes, Ariana DeBose, and Sasha Hutchings. The musicians on the album are Alex Lacamoire, Kurt Crowley, Andres Forero, Robin Macatangay, Richard Hammond, Benny Reiner, Jonathan Dinklage, Erin Benim Mayland, Anja Wood, Mario Gotoh, and Laura Sherman. It achieved the largest first week sales for a digital cast album and is the highest-charting cast album since 1963. It was the highest-selling Broadway cast album of 2015 and peaked at number one on the Rap Albums chart, the first cast album to ever do so. After being certified nine times platinum by the RIAA in 2021, Hamilton became the best-selling cast album of all time.

Commercial reception
The cast album for the musical premiered in September 2015 on NPR's website. Its digital release on September 25, 2015, debuted on numerous charts and was released in stores as a two-disc set on October 16, 2015. It debuted at number one on the Top Broadway Albums chart, as well as number 3 on Top Rap Albums. Hamilton's debut was the second-biggest first week sales of a Broadway cast album, just behind the cast album for the musical Rent. It debuted at number 12 on the overall Billboard 200 chart for sales, with over 2.1 million streams combined from digital service providers, the largest streaming debut for a cast album ever. Following the 70th Tony Awards in 2016, the album re-peaked at number 3 on the Billboard 200 chart, making it one of only three cast recordings to reach the top 10 in the last 50 years. The album reached a new peak of number two in July 2020, following the release of the live stage film of the Broadway production on July 3, 2020. This made Hamilton the highest charting cast album since Hair in 1969. This peak also came on the album's 250th consecutive week on the Billboard 200.

The album was the highest-selling Broadway cast album of 2015 and peaked at number one on the Top Rap Albums chart, the first cast album to ever do so. It achieved the largest first week sales for a digital cast album and was the highest-charting cast album debut since 1963. It sold 169,000 copies in 2015, and a further 739,000 copies in 2016, making it the fifth best-selling album of 2016. It was certified 6x Multiplatinum by the RIAA on April 4, 2019, making it the best-selling cast recording of all time. That record was extended when the album was certified 7× platinum on September 16, 2020. As of July 2020 the album has sold 1.97 million pure copies.

Critical reception

Billboard called the album an "eye-popping debut", giving it a 5-out-of-5 star review and listing it at number 2 on the magazine's 50 Best Albums of 2015. Rolling Stone gave it a 4.5-out-of-5 star rating, listing it at number 8 on the magazine's Top 50 Albums of 2015. Robert Christgau wrote in Vice, "I can attest that the intrinsic intellectual interest [Lin-Manuel Miranda] powers up here is so impressive it's exciting".

Lin-Manuel Miranda made a conscious decision to exclude one scene in the performance from the cast album, "Tomorrow There'll Be More of Us", also known as Laurens' Interlude.

Track listing

Interpolations
 "My Shot" contains elements of "Shook Ones Pt. II" written by Albert Johnson and Kejuan Waliek Muchita; "Going Back to Cali" written by Osteen Harvey Jr., Roger Troutman and Christopher Wallace; and "You've Got to Be Carefully Taught" from South Pacific, music by Richard Rodgers and lyrics by Oscar Hammerstein II.
 "Right Hand Man" contains elements of "The Modern Major General" from The Pirates of Penzance written by W. S. Gilbert and Arthur Sullivan.
 "Ten Duel Commandments" contains elements of "Ten Crack Commandments" written by Christopher E. Martin, Christopher Wallace, and Khary Kimani Turner.
 "Meet Me Inside" contains elements of "Party Up (Up in Here)" written by Kasseem Dean and Earl Simmons.
 "Cabinet Battle #1" contains elements of "The Message" written by Clifton Nathaniel Chase, Edward G. Fletcher, Melvin Glover, and Sylvia Robinson.
 "Say No to This" contains elements of "Nobody Needs to Know" from The Last Five Years, music and lyrics by Jason Robert Brown.
 "Cabinet Battle #2" contains elements of "Juicy (It's All Good)" written by Sean Combs, James Mtume, Jean-Claude Olivier, and Wallace.
 "Blow Us All Away" contains elements of "Ten Crack Commandments" written by Martin, Wallace, and Turner; and "Shook Ones Pt. II" written by Johnson and Muchita.
 "The World Was Wide Enough" contains elements of "Ten Crack Commandments" written by Martin, Wallace, and Turner.

Personnel

Cast
 Lin-Manuel Miranda – Alexander Hamilton
 Phillipa Soo – Eliza Hamilton
 Leslie Odom Jr. – Aaron Burr
 Renée Elise Goldsberry – Angelica Schuyler
 Christopher Jackson – George Washington
 Daveed Diggs – Marquis de Lafayette / Thomas Jefferson
 Okieriete Onaodowan – Hercules Mulligan / James Madison
 Anthony Ramos – John Laurens / Philip Hamilton
 Jasmine Cephas Jones – Peggy Schuyler / Maria Reynolds
 Jonathan Groff – King George III
 Sydney James Harcourt – James Reynolds 
 Thayne Jasperson – Samuel Seabury
 Jon Rua – Charles Lee
 Ephraim Sykes – George Eacker

Ensemble vocals
 Carleigh Bettiol
 Andrew Chappelle
 Ariana DeBose
 Alysha Deslorieux
 Sydney James Harcourt
 Neil Haskell
 Sasha Hutchings
 Thayne Jasperson
 Stephanie Klemons
 Morgan Marcell
 Javier Muñoz
 Emmy Raver-Lampman
 Jon Rua
 Austin Smith
 Seth Stewart
 Betsy Struxness
 Ephraim Sykes
 Voltaire Wade-Greene

Production
 Alex Lacamoire – production, orchestrations
 Bill Sherman – production
 Lin-Manuel Miranda – production, executive production
 Ahmir Thompson & Tariq Trotter for the Roots – production, executive production
 Craig Kallman – associate production
 Riggs Morales – associate production
 Sean Patrick Flahaven – associate production
 Thomas Kail – associate production
 Tyler Hartman – assistant engineering
 Ron Robinson – assistant engineering
 Ebonie Smith – assistant engineering
 Tom Coyne – mastering
 Michael Keller – music coordination
 Michael Aarons – music coordination
 Randy Cohen – synthesizer and drum programming
 Nevin Steinberg – Broadway sound effects
 Scott Wasserman – Ableton programming
 Taylor Williams – associate synthesizer programming
 Jeremy King – assistant synthesizer programming
 Will Wells – drum samples and additional loop editing
 Tim Latham – mixing
 Derik Lee – recording
 Emily Grishman – music copying
 Katharine Edmonds – music copying

Musicians
 Alex Lacamoire – conducting, keyboard 1
 Kurt Crowley – keyboard 2, associate music direction
 Jonathan Dinklage – concertmaster
 Erin Benim Mayland – violin
 Mario Gotoh – viola, violin
 Anja Wood – cello
 Andres Forero – drums
 Benny Reiner – percussion, keyboard
 Richard Hammond – bass, keyboard
 Robin Macatangay – guitars, banjos

Additional musicians for recording
 Laura Sherman – harp
 Ahmir "Questlove" Thompson – wood table on "Aaron Burr, Sir"

Charts

Weekly charts

Year-end charts

Decade-end charts

Certifications

Song certifications

Awards

References

External links
 Official website

Cast recordings
Theatre soundtracks
Atlantic Records soundtracks
2015 soundtrack albums
Hip hop soundtracks
Hamilton (musical)
Grammy Award for Best Musical Theater Album
Albums produced by Lin-Manuel Miranda